Matlalcueitl may refer to:

 Matlalcueitl (Mesoamerican deity), name of a deity from Tlaxcalan mythology.
 Matlalcueitl (volcano), a dormant volcano in Mexico.